Dihydroisoindole may refer to:

 2,3-Dihydroisoindole (isoindoline)
 4,7-Dihydroisoindole